Concord College is an independent co-educational international day/boarding school in Shropshire, England situated in the grounds of Acton Burnell Castle. The college admits students aged between 12 and 19; the majority of whom come from overseas. Concord College excels in academic results with an 85% A*-A at A-level and 82% A*-A at GCSE level.

In 2009, to celebrate its 60th year, Concord was visited by the Princess Royal.

History
The main building of Concord College is Acton Burnell Hall, the manor house of Acton Burnell Castle.

Ranking
In 2016, The Times league table for independent co-educational schools in the UK placed Concord tenth in the UK. In 2022, The Telegraph ranked Concord College's A-level results as 16th amongst all UK independent schools, and 7th for those which offer boarding.

Notable former pupils

 Marty Natalegawa, Indonesian Minister of Foreign Affairs
 Zeinal Bava, telecoms entrepreneur
 Bowie Cheung (張寶兒), Hong Kong presenter and actress, Miss Hong Kong 2016 contestant
 Anthony Chow (周永健), practising solicitor of Hong Kong and England & Wales, former chairman of the Hong Kong Jockey Club, former president of the Law Society of Hong Kong
 Pim van Strien, member of the House of Representatives of the Netherlands (2021-)

Notable staff
 David Moyes worked as a football coach at Concord College while playing for Shrewsbury Town F.C.

See also
Listed buildings in Acton Burnell

References

External links 
Official Website
Profile on the Independent Schools Council website
Profile on The Good Schools Guide

Boarding schools in Shropshire
Private schools in Shropshire